In tennis, the 2013 US Open Series (known as Emirates Airline US Open Series for sponsorships reasons) was the tenth edition of the US Open Series, which included ten hard court tournaments that started on July 20, 2013 in Atlanta and concluded in Winston-Salem for the men and in New Haven for the women on August 24, 2013. This edition consisted of four separate men's tournaments and four women's tournaments, with the Western & Southern Open hosting both a men's and women's event. The series was headlined by two ATP World Tour Masters 1000 and two WTA Premier 5 events. Rafael Nadal and Serena Williams were the US Open Series winners, making them eligible for a $1 million bonus if either also won the US Open, a feat which they both accomplished, hence receiving the largest paychecks to date for a single tennis tournament, totalling $3.6 million each.

Point distribution for series events
In order to be included in the standings and subsequently the bonus prize money, a player needed to have countable results from two different tournaments. The players who finished in the top three in the series can earn up to $1 million in extra prize money at the US Open.

US Open Series standings
The standings include all players who received points in at least two tournaments.

ATP

Notes:
1 – Tours – Number of tournaments in US Open Series in which a player has reached the quarterfinals or better, in 250 and 500 series events or the Round of 16 in ATP World Tour Masters 1000 events.

WTA

Notes:
1 – Tours – Number of tournaments in US Open Series in which a player has reached the quarterfinals or better, in Premier events; or the Round of 16 or better in Premier 5 events.

Bonus Prize Money
Top three players in the 2013 US Open Series will receive bonus prize money, depending on where they finish in the 2013 US Open, according to money schedule below.

2013 schedule

Week 1

ATP – BB&T Atlanta Open

Main draw finals

WTA – Bank of the West Classic

Main draw finals

Week 2

ATP – Citi Open

Main draw finals

WTA – Southern California Open

Main draw finals

Week 3

ATP – Rogers Cup (Montreal)

Main draw finals

WTA – Rogers Cup (Toronto)

Main draw finals

Week 4

ATP – Western & Southern Open

Main draw finals

WTA – Western & Southern Open

Main draw finals

Week 5

ATP – Winston-Salem Open

Main draw finals

WTA – New Haven Open at Yale

Main draw finals

References

External links